The Vardar Army of the Ottoman Empire (Turkish: Vardar Ordusu) was one of the field armies under the command of the Western Army. It was formed during the mobilisation phase of the First Balkan War.

Order of Battle, October 19, 1912 

On October 19, 1912, the army was structured as follows:

 Vardar Army HQ (Serbian Front, concentration center: Kumanovo)
V Corps
13th Division, 15th Division, 16th Division
İştip Redif Division
VI Corps
17th Division, 18th Division
Manastır Redif Division, Drama Redif Division
VII Corps
19th Division
Üsküp Redif Division, Priştine Redif Division
II Provisional Corps
Uşak Redif Division, Smyrna Redif Division, Denizli Redif Division 
Firzovik Detachment
Taşlıca Detachment
Independent Cavalry Division
7th Cavalry Brigade, 8th Cavalry Brigade

Order of Battle, November 12, 1912 

On November 12, 1912, the army was structured as follows:

 Vardar Army HQ (Serbian Front, Monastir)
Northern Group
V Corps
13th Division
15th Division
5th Rifle Regiment
26th Cavalry Regiment
19th Artillery Regiment
VII Corps
19th Division
İştip Redif Division
17th Cavalry Regiment
Southern Group
VI Corps
16th Division
18th Division
6th Rifle Regiment
Southeastern Group
17th Division
Manastır Redif Division
Independent Cavalry Brigade

Order of Battle, November 16, 1912 

On November 16, 1912, the army was structured as follows:

 Vardar Army HQ (Serbian Front, Monastir)
Left Flank Offensive Corps
VI Corps
16th Division
19th Division
Fethi Bey Detachment
Independent Cavalry Brigade
Right Flank Defensive Corps
VII Corps
İştip Redif Division
V Corps
13th Division
15th Division
18th Division

Sources 

Field armies of the Ottoman Empire
Military units and formations of the Ottoman Empire in the Balkan Wars
Ottoman Albania
Macedonia under the Ottoman Empire
1912 establishments in the Ottoman Empire